Blairstown is a city in Benton County, Iowa, United States. The population was 713 at the 2020 census. It is part of the Cedar Rapids Metropolitan Statistical Area.

History
Blairstown was platted in 1862. It was named for John Insley Blair, a railroad official.

Geography

Demographics

2010 census
As of the census of 2010, there were 692 people, 295 households, and 199 families living in the city. The racial makeup of the city was 97.8% White, 0.7% African American, 0.1% Native American, 0.1% Asian, 1.0% from other races, and 0.1% from two or more races. Hispanic or Latino of any race were 4.3% of the population.

There were 295 households, of which 33.2% had children under the age of 18 living with them, 53.2% were married couples living together, 7.1% had a female householder with no husband present, 7.1% had a male householder with no wife present, and 32.5% were non-families. 28.1% of all households were made up of individuals, and 14.3% had someone living alone who was 65 years of age or older. The average household size was 2.35 and the average family size was 2.79.

The median age in the city was 39 years. 25.7% of residents were under the age of 18; 7.1% were between the ages of 18 and 24; 25.6% were from 25 to 44; 24.7% were from 45 to 64; and 17.1% were 65 years of age or older. The gender makeup of the city was 50.1% male and 49.9% female.

2000 census
As of the census of 2000, there were 682 people, 289 households, and 195 families living in the city. The racial makeup of the city was 99.41% White, 0.15% from other races, and 0.44% from two or more races. Hispanic or Latino of any race were 0.29% of the population.

There were 289 households, out of which 30.1% had children under the age of 18 living with them, 57.4% were married couples living together, 8.3% had a female householder with no husband present, and 32.2% were non-families. 28.7% of all households were made up of individuals, and 16.3% had someone living alone who was 65 years of age or older. The average household size was 2.36 and the average family size was 2.87.

24.8% are under the age of 18, 6.5% from 18 to 24, 27.1% from 25 to 44, 19.2% from 45 to 64, and 22.4% who were 65 years of age or older. The median age was 39 years. For every 100 females, there were 86.3 males. For every 100 females age 18 and over, there were 86.5 males.

The median income for a household in the city was $40,662, and the median income for a family was $47,778. Males had a median income of $36,705 versus $22,083 for females. The per capita income for the city was $16,828. About 5.9% of families and 11.0% of the population were below the poverty line, including 17.5% of those under age 18 and 11.6% of those age 65 or over.

Arts and culture
Blairstown holds an annual "Sauerkraut Days" celebration.

Rolle Bolle

Many Blairstown residents still play the Belgian yard game Rolle Bolle (called krulbollen in Belgium), first brought to the region by Belgian immigrants in the late 19th and early 20th centuries. Blairstown's courts are located in the Blairstown Ball Park. A game of Rolle Bolle is part of the annual Sauerkraut Days celebration. Rolle Bolle is also played in the nearby towns of Belle Plaine, Clutier, Victor, Marengo, and Ladora.

Education
Benton Community School District operates local public schools.

See also

 List of cities in Iowa

References

Cities in Benton County, Iowa
Cities in Iowa
Cedar Rapids, Iowa metropolitan area
1862 establishments in Iowa